Chernyshovo is a rural locality (a village) in Vysokovskoye Rural Settlement, Ust-Kubinsky District, Vologda Oblast, Russia. The population was 15 as of 2002.

Geography 
Chernyshovo is located 11 km southeast of Ustye (the district's administrative centre) by road. Kochurovo is the nearest rural locality.

References 

Rural localities in Tarnogsky District